Back to the Sea is an English-language Chinese 3D traditional animated family comedy film. It was released on January 27, 2012, in Canada and November 16, 2012, in the United States The Film Received negative reviews from Critics, and was (possibly) a box office bomb.

Plot
Kevin the flying fish and his family and friends live happy and carefree life in the depths of the Atlantic Ocean. But Kevin has a cherished dream - to get to Barbados, to the flying fish kingdom. His thirst for adventures leads him to the Rock of Fame where a family treasure - a huge pearl is hidden. Kevin gets captured by fishers and then finds himself in an aquarium of a popular Chinese restaurant. It seems that his fate is decided, but suddenly a small boy comes to the aid to Kevin.

Voice Cast
Yuri Lowenthal as Kevin, a blue & orange flying fish, the main protagonist
Kath Soucie as Shaobao
Tom Kenny as Ben a green surgeonfish
Mark Hamill as Bunker an octopus
Matthew Yang King as Dabao
Tim Curry as Eric
Christian Slater as Jack
Tara Strong as Sammy a female yellow canary rockfish
James Sie as Cook Liu
Sam Riegel as Short Seagull
Fred Tatasciore as Fat Seagull
Ali Hillis as Teaching Fish
Chris Edgerly as Clean Fish
John DiMaggio as Boss
Annie Mumolo as Danny
Nolan North as Farley
Kate Higgins as Little Fish
Ogie Banks as Richard
Gwendoline Yeo as Waitress
Hynden Walch as Tiny Fish
Justin Cowden as Marvin an shrimp
Andrew Dolan as Pat Down Cop

Release
This film was released in theaters in Canada in 3D and regular "2D" formats on January 27, 2012. It got a limited release in the United States on November 16, 2012, distributed by Viva Pictures.

Music
The film's score is composed by Gordon McGhie. This film features the popular song What a Wonderful World from Louis Armstrong.

External links

Back to the Sea on Behind the Voice Actors

2012 films
Chinese-language films
2010s American animated films
2012 animated films
Animated adventure films
Animated buddy films
American animated comedy films
Animated films about animals
Animated films about fish
2010s children's adventure films
2010s children's animated films
2010s children's comedy films
Chinese animated films
Chinese children's films
Fictional fish
Films about animal rights
Films set in New York City
Films set in the United States
2012 comedy films
2010s English-language films